Bradel is a surname. Notable people with the surname include:

Ernst-Joachim Bradel (1909–1994), German Oberst
P. Jean-Baptiste Bradel (18th century), French engraver
Walter Bradel (1911–1943), German pilot
Zdzisław Bradel (born 1950), Polish politician, poet, and journalist

See also
Bradel binding, a style of bookbinding